Georgi Georgiev (born 20 October 1987) is a Bulgarian alpine skier. He has competed at the 2014 Winter Olympics in Sochi.

References

External links

1987 births
Alpine skiers at the 2014 Winter Olympics
Living people
Olympic alpine skiers of Bulgaria
Bulgarian male alpine skiers
Place of birth missing (living people)
21st-century Bulgarian people